María Isabel Rivera Torres (born 1952) better known as Mabel Rivera is a Spanish actress from Galicia (Spain).

She was born in the City and Naval Station of Ferrol (Corunna), North-western Spain. Though she started her career as an actress in the 1980s, it was not until her lead actress role in the Oscar-winning Best Foreign Language Film 2004 The Sea Inside that she received broad recognition.

She is fluent in Galician, Spanish, and Catalan, regional languages of Spain. She also speaks English and French with varying degrees of fluency.

Filmography

External links
Marian Rivera Unlimited

1952 births
Living people
Spanish actresses
People from Ferrol, Spain
Best Supporting Actress Goya Award winners
20th-century Spanish actresses
21st-century Spanish actresses
Actresses from Galicia (Spain)